KPCP (88.3 FM) was a radio station licensed to serve the community of New Roads, Louisiana. The station was last owned by Stop the Violence/Save the Children, Inc., and aired a variety format.

The station was assigned the KPCP call letters by the Federal Communications Commission on December 27, 2007. 

KPCP's license was cancelled by the FCC on April 12, 2022, due to the station having been silent for more than 12 months.

References

External links
 FCC Public Inspection File for KPCP
 

Radio stations in Louisiana
Radio stations established in 2011
Radio stations disestablished in 2022
2011 establishments in Louisiana
2022 disestablishments in Louisiana
Defunct radio stations in the United States
Defunct mass media in Louisiana
Pointe Coupee Parish, Louisiana